Transparency is the debut album by trumpeter Herb Robertson recorded in 1985 and released on the JMT label.

Reception
The AllMusic review by Glenn Astarita states, "this is a significant outing by a trumpeter who has influenced many yet has evaded widespread recognition over the years. Recommended".

Track listing
All compositions by Herb Robertson
 "Prolog" - 0:45   
 "Floatasia" - 8:24   
 "Flocculus" - 9:18   
 "Transparency" - 2:45   
 "They Don't Know About Me Yet" - 5:05   
 "Enigmatic Suite: Part 1 - Synergy, Part 2 - Overcast" - 6:15   
 "Part 3 - A Little Ditty" - 11:38
 "Epilog" - 1:06

Personnel
Herb Robertson - cornet, trumpet, flugelhorn
Tim Berne - alto saxophone
Bill Frisell - guitar
Lindsey Horner - bass
Joey Baron - drums, percussion

References 

1985 albums
Herb Robertson albums
JMT Records albums
Winter & Winter Records albums